David Maurice Mercier (July 20, 1939 – April 12, 2021) was a Canadian politician. He served in the Legislative Assembly of British Columbia from 1986 to 1991, as a Social Credit member for the constituency of Burnaby-Edmonds. He was a chartered accountant. Mercier was mayor of Burnaby, British Columbia from 1979 to 1981.

On October 3, 1989, Mercier and three colleagues — Graham Bruce, Duane Delton Crandall, and Doug Mowat — quit the governing Social Credit caucus to sit as "Independent Social Credit" members. In a joint statement, the four stressed that they "in no way desire[d] the fall of our government", but wished to spur an "open and realistic assessment" of Bill Vander Zalm's continued leadership. Mercier returned the Socred caucus on February 14, 1990, alongside Bruce and Mowat (Crandall had already rejoined caucus in January). Mercier explained his move by saying his concerns about Vander Zalm's leadership and re-election chances had been addressed.

He was the leader of the British Columbia Conservative Party between 1997 until 2001. Mercier died in 2021 from complications of Parkinson's disease.

References

1939 births
British Columbia Conservative Party leaders
British Columbia Social Credit Party MLAs
Canadian accountants
2021 deaths
Members of the Executive Council of British Columbia
Politicians from Vancouver